Jordi Martin Emmanuel Osei-Tutu (born 2 October 1998) is an English professional footballer who plays as a right-back for Bundesliga club VfL Bochum.

Career

Arsenal 
In July 2015, Osei-Tutu joined the youth academy of Arsenal from Reading. He signed his first professional contract in October 2015.

Loan to VfL Bochum 
In June 2019, it was announced that he would join German second-division club VfL Bochum on loan for the 2019–20 season. On 9 July 2019, in his second appearance for Bochum, Osei-Tutu was racially abused in a friendly against Swiss club St. Gallen, causing Osei-Tutu to temporarily leave the field of play. Osei-Tutu made his professional debut for Bochum in the 2. Bundesliga on 28 July 2019, starting in the 3–1 away defeat against Jahn Regensburg. He scored his first goal in his professional career in a 3–1 win over SV Wehen Wiesbaden on 24 August.

Over the course of the loan spell, Osei-Tutu made 21 appearances, scored five goals and provided three assists.

Loan to Cardiff City 
On 25 August 2020, Osei-Tutu joined Championship side Cardiff City on a season-long loan deal. He made his debut in a 3–0 loss against Northampton Town in the first round of the Carabao Cup on 5 September 2020. After seven appearances, he had suffered a serious hamstring injury in mid-October and kept him out of the team since then.

Loan to Nottingham Forest 
On 10 August 2021, Osei-Tutu moved to Championship club Nottingham Forest on a season-long loan. On 6 January 2022, his loan was terminated after struggling with injuries during his spell at the club.

Loan to Rotherham United 
On 31 January 2022, Osei-Tutu moved to EFL League One club Rotherham United on loan until the end of the season.

Return to VfL Bochum 
On 23 June 2022, VfL Bochum announced the return of Osei-Tutu on a free transfer, with Osei-Tutu signing three-year deal.

Personal life
Osei-Tutu was born in Slough, Berkshire and is of Ghanaian descent.

Career statistics

Honours
Rotherham United
League One runner-up: 2021–22
EFL Trophy: 2021–22

References

External links

 
 
 
 

1998 births
Living people
Sportspeople from Slough
Footballers from Berkshire
English footballers
Association football defenders
Arsenal F.C. players
VfL Bochum players
Cardiff City F.C. players 
Nottingham Forest F.C. players 
Rotherham United F.C. players
2. Bundesliga players
Black British sportspeople
English Football League players
English expatriate footballers
Expatriate footballers in Germany
English expatriate sportspeople in Germany
English people of Ghanaian descent